A tripping (or obstruction tripping) penalty in ice hockey and ringette is called by the referee when a player trips an opposing player with their hockey stick or ringette stick, or uses their skate against the other players skate ("slew footing"), causing them to lose balance or fall and obstruct them from making their desired play. This article deals chiefly with ice hockey.

A tripping call usually results in a two-minute minor penalty on the player that caused the infraction.  However, if the player is called for slew footing, he receives a match penalty.  If the player was tripped on a breakaway (with no opponents to pass other than the goaltender), a tripping call may instead result in a penalty shot for the tripped player.

See also
Penalty (ice hockey)

References

Ice hockey penalties
Ice hockey terminology